Studzianki may refer to the following places:
Studzianki, Piotrków County in Łódź Voivodeship (central Poland)
Studzianki, Rawa County in Łódź Voivodeship (central Poland)
Studzianki, Tomaszów Mazowiecki County in Łódź Voivodeship (central Poland)
Studzianki, Lublin Voivodeship (east Poland)
Studzianki, Masovian Voivodeship (east-central Poland)
Studzianki Pancerne in Masovian Voivodeship (east-central Poland)
Studzianki, Podlaskie Voivodeship (north-east Poland)
Studzianki, Świętokrzyskie Voivodeship (south-central Poland)

Battle of Studzianki